Lumber Yard Bar is a gay bar in White Center, in the U.S. state of Washington.

History 
The bar opened in January 2018. A fire (classified as arson) in July forced the business to close and relocate.

Lumber Yard Bar is owned by Nathan Adams and Michale Farrar. The bar has hosted show tune sing-alongs.

Reception 

Esquire included Lumber Yard in a 2022 list of the 32 best gay bars in the United States and said, "Comfortable and fun for leather daddies, trans women, bears and cubs, and lipstick lesbians alike, Lumberyard is a throwback to an earlier era, but in the best possible way. The original was burned down in an anti-gay hate-crime a few years back, but the revival has just opened across the street and is bigger and better, with a new performance space."

References

External links 

 
 

2018 establishments in Washington (state)
King County, Washington
LGBT drinking establishments in Washington (state)
Restaurants established in 2018